The Indian locomotive class WCP-3 is a class of 1.5 kV DC electric locomotives that was developed in late 1920s by Hawthorn Leslie for Indian Railways. The model name stands for broad gauge (W), Direct Current (C), Passenger traffic (P) engine, 3rd generation (3). They entered service in 1930. A single WCP-3 was built at England between 1928 and 1929.

The WCP-1 served both passenger trains for over 40 years. With the introduction of more modern types of locomotives  and 25 KV AC electrification, all were withdrawn by early 1960s. Today the locomotive is scrapped.

History 
The electrification of the Great Indian Peninsular Railway (GIPR) began in 1922. Powerful locomotives were required to transport the express trains on the mountain railway to overcome the Western Ghats. They also had to be able to reach speeds of 85 miles an hour (137 km / h) - a very high speed at that time, which was not even the case with the E 501 and 502 of the Paris-Orleans Railway had been requested. Three test locomotives were therefore ordered from different manufacturers in order to be able to select a suitable design for the series. The tender and evaluation was monitored by the UK electrical engineering firm Merz & McLellan in London.

GIPR ordered the following test locomotives in 1923.

Specification 
The locomotive has three individually driven axles and two two-axle bogies. The axes were driven by a hollow shaft drive from GEC. Technically, it should have some similarities with No. 13 of the North Eastern Railway (NER), otherwise little is known about this locomotive.

See also 

Rail transport in India#History
Indian Railways
Locomotives of India
Rail transport in India

References

Books

External links
http://www.irfca.org/faq/faq-specs.html#WCP-3

India railway fan club

Electric locomotives of India
1500 V DC locomotives
Railway locomotives introduced in 1928
5 ft 6 in gauge locomotives
SLM locomotives